The following is a list of all 1407 species and 60 hybrids in the flowering plant genus Rubus, many of which are called blackberries, raspberries, dewberries and brambles, which are accepted by Plants of the World Online .

A

 Rubus abchaziensis 
 Rubus acanthodes 
 Rubus acanthophyllos 
 Rubus acclivitatum 
 Rubus accrescens 
 Rubus × acer 
 Rubus aciodontus 
 Rubus acridentulus 
 Rubus acroglotta 
 Rubus acuminatissimus 
 Rubus acuminatus 
 Rubus acutifrons 
 Rubus acutipetalus 
 Rubus adamsii 
 Rubus adenacanthus 
 Rubus adenoleucus 
 Rubus adenomallus 
 Rubus adenophorus 
 Rubus adenothallus 
 Rubus adenotrichos 
 Rubus adornatoides 
 Rubus adscharicus 
 Rubus adscitus 
 Rubus adspersus 
 Rubus adulans 
 Rubus aenigmaticus 
 Rubus aequalidens 
 Rubus aethiopicus 
 Rubus aetnensis 
 Rubus aetnicus 
 Rubus affinis 
 Rubus aggregatus 
 Rubus aghadergensis 
 Rubus agricastrorum 
 Rubus alaskensis 
 Rubus albiflorus 
 Rubus albionis 
 Rubus alceifolius 
 Rubus alexeterius 
 Rubus allanderi 
 Rubus allegheniensis 
 Rubus almorensis 
 Rubus alnifolius 
 Rubus alpestris 
 Rubus alpinus 
 Rubus alterniflorus 
 Rubus altiarcuatus 
 Rubus alumnus 
 Rubus amabilis 
 Rubus amamianus 
 Rubus ambigens 
 Rubus ambrosius 
 Rubus ambulans 
 Rubus amiantinus 
 Rubus amisiensis 
 Rubus ammobius 
 Rubus amphidasys 
 Rubus amphimalacus 
 Rubus amphistrophos 
 Rubus amplificatus 
 Rubus andegavensis 
 Rubus andicola 
 Rubus anglobelgicus 
 Rubus anglofuscus 
 Rubus angloserpens 
 Rubus angustibracteatus 
 Rubus angusticuspis 
 Rubus angustipaniculatus 
 Rubus angustisetus 
 Rubus anhaltianus 
 Rubus anisacanthopsis 
 Rubus anisacanthos 
 Rubus annamensis 
 Rubus antonii 
 Rubus apatelus 
 Rubus apertiflorus 
 Rubus apetalus 
 Rubus aphananthus 
 Rubus aphidifer 
 Rubus appropinquatus 
 Rubus apricus 
 Rubus arabicus 
 Rubus arachnoideus 
 Rubus archboldianus 
 Rubus arcticus 
 Rubus arduennensis 
 Rubus × areschougii 
 Rubus argentifrons 
 Rubus argutus 
 Rubus ariconiensis 
 Rubus aristisepalus 
 Rubus armeniacus 
 Rubus armipotens 
 Rubus arrhenii 
 Rubus arrheniiformis 
 Rubus arvinus 
 Rubus asirensis 
 Rubus asperidens 
 Rubus assamensis 
 Rubus × astarae 
 Rubus atrebatum 
 Rubus atrichantherus 
 Rubus atrovinosus 
 Rubus aurantiacus 
 Rubus aureolus 
 Rubus australis 
 Rubus austromoravicus 
 Rubus austrosinensis 
 Rubus austroslovacus 
 Rubus austrotibetanus 
 Rubus avaloniensis 
 Rubus axillaris 
 Rubus azuayensis

B

 Rubus × babae 
 Rubus babingtonianus 
 Rubus babingtonii 
 Rubus bagnallianus 
 Rubus bakerianus 
 Rubus balticus 
 Rubus bambusarum 
 Rubus banghamii 
 Rubus barberi 
 Rubus × barkeri 
 Rubus baronicus 
 Rubus barrandienicus 
 Rubus bartonianus 
 Rubus bartonii 
 Rubus bavaricus 
 Rubus beccarii 
 Rubus benguetensis 
 Rubus bercheriensis 
 Rubus bertramii 
 Rubus betckei 
 Rubus betonicifolius 
 Rubus bicolor 
 Rubus biflorus 
 Rubus × biformispinus 
 Rubus bifrons 
 Rubus biloensis 
 Rubus birmanicus 
 Rubus blepharoneurus 
 Rubus bloxamianus 
 Rubus bloxamii 
 Rubus bogotensis 
 Rubus bohemiicola 
 Rubus bohemopolonicus 
 Rubus boliviensis 
 Rubus bollei 
 Rubus bombycinus 
 Rubus bonatianus 
 Rubus boninensis 
 Rubus bonus-henricus 
 Rubus boraeanus 
 Rubus botryeros 
 Rubus boudiccae 
 Rubus boulayi 
 Rubus bovinus 
 Rubus × boyntonii 
 Rubus bracteosus 
 Rubus braeuckeri 
 Rubus braeuckeriformis 
 Rubus brasiliensis 
 Rubus brdensis 
 Rubus breconensis 
 Rubus bregutiensis 
 Rubus brevipetiolatus 
 Rubus brevistaminosus 
 Rubus briareus 
 Rubus brigantinus 
 Rubus briggsianus 
 Rubus britannicus 
 Rubus brunneri 
 Rubus buchtienii 
 Rubus bucknallii 
 Rubus buergeri 
 Rubus buhnensis 
 Rubus bullatus 
 Rubus burkillii

C

 Rubus caeresiensis 
 Rubus caesarius 
 Rubus caesius 
 Rubus caflischii 
 Rubus calcareus 
 Rubus × calopalmatus 
 Rubus calophyllus 
 Rubus calotemnus 
 Rubus calvatus 
 Rubus calviformis 
 Rubus calvus 
 Rubus calycacanthus 
 Rubus calycinoides 
 Rubus calycinus 
 Rubus calyculatus 
 Rubus cambrensis 
 Rubus campaniensis 
 Rubus camptostachys 
 Rubus canadensis 
 Rubus canaliculatus 
 Rubus canduliger 
 Rubus canescens 
 Rubus caninitergi 
 Rubus cantabrigiensis 
 Rubus canterburiensis 
 Rubus cantianus 
 Rubus capitulatus 
 Rubus capricollensis 
 Rubus cardiophyllus 
 Rubus carduelis 
 Rubus cartalinicus 
 Rubus casparyi 
 Rubus castellarnaui 
 Rubus × castoreus 
 Rubus castroviejoi 
 Rubus caucasicus 
 Rubus caucasigenus 
 Rubus caudatisepalus 
 Rubus caudifolius 
 Rubus cavatifolius 
 Rubus celticus 
 Rubus centrobohemicus 
 Rubus ceratifolius 
 Rubus cerdicii 
 Rubus ceticus 
 Rubus chaerophylloides 
 Rubus chaerophyllus 
 Rubus chaetophorus 
 Rubus chamaemorus 
 Rubus chambicus 
 Rubus chapmanianus 
 Rubus charadzeae 
 Rubus chenonii 
 Rubus chevalieri 
 Rubus chiliadenus 
 Rubus chingii 
 Rubus chloocladus 
 Rubus chloophyllus 
 Rubus chloranthus 
 Rubus chlorothyrsos 
 Rubus choachiensis 
 Rubus christiansenorum 
 Rubus chroosepalus 
 Rubus chrysobotrys 
 Rubus chrysocarpus 
 Rubus chrysogaeus 
 Rubus chrysophyllus 
 Rubus chrysoxylon 
 Rubus cimbricus 
 Rubus cinclidodictyus 
 Rubus cinerascens 
 Rubus cinerosiformis 
 Rubus cinerosus 
 Rubus circipanicus 
 Rubus cissburiensis 
 Rubus cissoides 
 Rubus clementis 
 Rubus clinocephalus 
 Rubus clusii 
 Rubus coccinatus 
 Rubus cochinchinensis 
 Rubus cochlearis 
 Rubus cockburnianus 
 Rubus collicola 
 Rubus × collinus 
 Rubus columellaris 
 Rubus commutatus 
 Rubus compactus 
 Rubus conchyliatus 
 Rubus condensatiformis 
 Rubus condensatus 
 Rubus conduplicatus 
 Rubus confertiflorus 
 Rubus confusidens 
 Rubus conjungens 
 Rubus conothyrsoides 
 Rubus conspersus 
 Rubus conspicuus 
 Rubus constrictus 
 Rubus contractipes 
 Rubus contritidens 
 Rubus coombensis 
 Rubus cooperi 
 Rubus copelandii 
 Rubus corbierei 
 Rubus corchorifolius 
 Rubus cordatifolius 
 Rubus cordatiformis 
 Rubus cordiformis 
 Rubus coreanus 
 Rubus coriaceus 
 Rubus coriifolius 
 Rubus cornubiensis 
 Rubus coronatus 
 Rubus correctispinosus 
 Rubus costaricanus 
 Rubus costifolius 
 Rubus cotteswoldensis 
 Rubus couchii 
 Rubus crassidens 
 Rubus crataegifolius 
 Rubus crepinii 
 Rubus crespignyanus 
 Rubus creticus 
 Rubus criniger 
 Rubus crispomarginatus 
 Rubus crispus 
 Rubus croceacanthus 
 Rubus crudelis 
 Rubus ctenodon 
 Rubus cubirianus 
 Rubus cumbrensis 
 Rubus cumingii 
 Rubus cuneifolius 
 Rubus cupanianus 
 Rubus curvaciculatus 
 Rubus curvispinosus 
 Rubus cuspidatus 
 Rubus cuspidifer 
 Rubus cyanophyllus 
 Rubus cyclomorphus 
 Rubus cyclops 
 Rubus cymosus 
 Rubus cyri 
 Rubus czarnunensis

D

 Rubus darssensis 
 Rubus dasycarpus 
 Rubus dasyphyllus 
 Rubus daveyi 
 Rubus dechenii 
 Rubus decumbens 
 Rubus decurrentispinus 
 Rubus decussatiformis 
 Rubus dejonghii 
 Rubus delabathiensis 
 Rubus delavayi 
 Rubus delectus 
 Rubus deliciosus 
 Rubus dentatifolius 
 Rubus derasifolius 
 Rubus deruyveri 
 Rubus desarmatus 
 Rubus dethardingii 
 Rubus devitatus 
 Rubus deweveri 
 Rubus diclinis 
 Rubus dierschkeanus 
 Rubus discernendus 
 Rubus dissimulans 
 Rubus distortifolius 
 Rubus distractiformis 
 Rubus distractus 
 Rubus divaricatus 
 Rubus diversus 
 Rubus × dobuniensis 
 Rubus doerrii 
 Rubus dolichocarpus 
 Rubus dolichophyllus 
 Rubus dollnensis 
 Rubus domingensis 
 Rubus doyonensis 
 Rubus drejeri 
 Rubus drenthicus 
 Rubus drymophilus 
 Rubus dufftianus 
 Rubus dumetorum 
 Rubus dumnoniensis 
 Rubus dunensis 
 Rubus dunnii 
 Rubus durospinosus 
 Rubus durotrigum 
 Rubus durus

E

 Rubus eboracensis 
 Rubus ebudensis 
 Rubus echinatoides 
 Rubus echinatus 
 Rubus echinosepalus 
 Rubus ecklonii 
 Rubus edeesii 
 Rubus edentulus 
 Rubus efferatus 
 Rubus effertus 
 Rubus effrenatus 
 Rubus eggersii 
 Rubus eglandulosus 
 Rubus egregius 
 Rubus egregiusculus 
 Rubus ehrnsbergeri 
 Rubus eiderianus 
 Rubus eifeliensis 
 Rubus elatior 
 Rubus elegans 
 Rubus elegantispinosus 
 Rubus ellipticus 
 Rubus elongatus 
 Rubus eluxatus 
 Rubus enslenii 
 Rubus epipsilos 
 Rubus erinulus 
 Rubus eriocarpus 
 Rubus erlangeri 
 Rubus errabundus 
 Rubus erubescens 
 Rubus erythrocarpus 
 Rubus erythroclados 
 Rubus erythrocomus 
 Rubus erythrops 
 Rubus erythrostachys 
 Rubus × esfandiarii 
 Rubus euanthinus 
 Rubus eucalyptus 
 Rubus euchloos 
 Rubus euryanthemus 
 Rubus eustephanos 
 Rubus evadens 
 Rubus evagatus 
 Rubus exarmatus 
 Rubus exstans

F

 Rubus faberi 
 Rubus fabrimontanus 
 Rubus fagifolius 
 Rubus fairholmianus 
 Rubus fanjingshanensis 
 Rubus fasciculatiformis 
 Rubus fasciculatus 
 Rubus favillatus 
 Rubus feddei 
 Rubus fellatae 
 Rubus ferdinandimuelleri 
 Rubus ferox 
 Rubus ferrugineus 
 Rubus ferus 
 Rubus festii 
 Rubus fimbrifolius 
 Rubus finitimus 
 Rubus fioniae 
 Rubus firmus 
 Rubus fissipetalus 
 Rubus fissus 
 Rubus flaccidifolius 
 Rubus flaccidus 
 Rubus flagellaris 
 Rubus flagelliflorus 
 Rubus flavescens 
 Rubus × flavinanus 
 Rubus floribundus 
 Rubus × floricomus 
 Rubus florifolius 
 Rubus flosculosus 
 Rubus fluvius 
 Rubus fockeanus 
 Rubus foersteri 
 Rubus foliaceistipulatus 
 Rubus foliosus 
 Rubus fontivagus 
 Rubus formidabilis 
 Rubus formosensis 
 Rubus forrestianus 
 Rubus franchetianus 
 Rubus franconicus 
 Rubus × fraseri 
 Rubus fraxinifoliolus 
 Rubus fraxinifolius 
 Rubus frederici 
 Rubus friesianus 
 Rubus friesiorum 
 Rubus frisicus 
 Rubus fritschii 
 Rubus fruticosus 
 Rubus fuernrohrii 
 Rubus fujianensis 
 Rubus furnarius 
 Rubus furvicolor 
 Rubus fuscicaulis 
 Rubus fuscicortex 
 Rubus fuscorubens 
 Rubus fuscoviridis 
 Rubus fuscus

G

 Rubus gachetensis 
 Rubus galeatus 
 Rubus galloecicus 
 Rubus gallofuscus 
 Rubus gardnerianus 
 Rubus gariannensis 
 Rubus gayeri 
 Rubus gelertii 
 Rubus geminatus 
 Rubus geniculatus 
 Rubus geoides 
 Rubus georgicus 
 Rubus × geraniifolius 
 Rubus germanicus 
 Rubus geromensis 
 Rubus ghanakantae 
 Rubus gillotii 
 Rubus glabratus 
 Rubus glabricarpus 
 Rubus glandisepalus 
 Rubus glandithyrsos 
 Rubus glandulifer 
 Rubus glanduliger 
 Rubus glandulosocalycinus 
 Rubus glandulosocarpus 
 Rubus glareosus 
 Rubus glaucifolius 
 Rubus glauciformis 
 Rubus glaucovirens 
 Rubus glaucus 
 Rubus glivicensis 
 Rubus glomeratus 
 Rubus gloriosus 
 Rubus glossoides 
 Rubus gneissogenes 
 Rubus godronii 
 Rubus gongshanensis 
 Rubus goniophorus 
 Rubus gothicus 
 Rubus grabowskii 
 Rubus gracilis 
 Rubus graecensis 
 Rubus grandipaniculatus 
 Rubus × grantii 
 Rubus granulatus 
 Rubus gratiosus 
 Rubus gratus 
 Rubus gravetii 
 Rubus grayanus 
 Rubus gremlii 
 Rubus gressittii 
 Rubus griesiae 
 Rubus griffithianus 
 Rubus griffithii 
 Rubus grisebachii 
 Rubus grypoacanthus 
 Rubus guentheri 
 Rubus guestphalicus 
 Rubus gunnianus 
 Rubus guttifer 
 Rubus guyanensis 
 Rubus gyamdaensis

H

 Rubus hadracanthos 
 Rubus hadrocarpus 
 Rubus haesitans 
 Rubus haeupleri 
 Rubus haitiensis 
 Rubus hakonensis 
 Rubus hallandicus 
 Rubus halsteadensis 
 Rubus hamiltonii 
 Rubus hanceanus 
 Rubus hantonensis 
 Rubus hapoliensis 
 Rubus haridasanii 
 Rubus hartmanii 
 Rubus hasbaniensis 
 Rubus hassicus 
 Rubus hasskarlii 
 Rubus hastifer 
 Rubus hastifolius 
 Rubus hastiformis 
 Rubus hatsushimae 
 Rubus hawaiensis 
 Rubus hebridensis 
 Rubus hemithyrsus 
 Rubus henkeri 
 Rubus henrici-egonis 
 Rubus henrici-weberi 
 Rubus henriquesii 
 Rubus henryi 
 Rubus hercynicus 
 Rubus herzogii 
 Rubus hesperius 
 Rubus heterobelus 
 Rubus heterophyllus 
 Rubus heterosepalus 
 Rubus hevellicus 
 Rubus hexagynus 
 Rubus hibernicus 
 Rubus hillii 
 Rubus hilsianus 
 Rubus hindii 
 Rubus × hiraseanus 
 Rubus hirsutior 
 Rubus hirsutus 
 Rubus hirtifolius 
 Rubus hirtus 
 Rubus hispidus 
 Rubus histriculus 
 Rubus histrionicus 
 Rubus hobroensis 
 Rubus hochstetterorum 
 Rubus hoffmeisterianus 
 Rubus holandrei 
 Rubus holerythrus 
 Rubus holosericeus 
 Rubus holtenii 
 Rubus holzfuszii 
 Rubus horrefactus 
 Rubus horridus 
 Rubus horripilus 
 Rubus hostilis 
 Rubus howii 
 Rubus huagaoxiensis 
 Rubus huangpingensis 
 Rubus humistratus 
 Rubus humulifolius 
 Rubus hunanensis 
 Rubus hybridus 
 Rubus hylanderi 
 Rubus hylocharis 
 Rubus hylonomus 
 Rubus hylophilus 
 Rubus hypomalacus 
 Rubus hypopitys 
 Rubus hyrcanus 
 Rubus hystricopsis

I

 Rubus ibericus 
 Rubus iceniensis 
 Rubus ichangensis 
 Rubus idaeifolius 
 Rubus × idaeoides 
 Rubus idaeopsis 
 Rubus idaeus 
 Rubus ignoratus 
 Rubus ikenoensis 
 Rubus illecebrosus 
 Rubus imbellis 
 Rubus imbricatus 
 Rubus imitans 
 Rubus × immanis 
 Rubus immodicus 
 Rubus imperialis 
 Rubus impressinervus 
 Rubus incanescens 
 Rubus incarnatus 
 Rubus incisior 
 Rubus incurvatiformis 
 Rubus incurvatus 
 Rubus indicissus 
 Rubus indicus 
 Rubus indusiatus 
 Rubus indutus 
 Rubus infestior 
 Rubus infestisepalus 
 Rubus infestus 
 Rubus informifolius 
 Rubus infrarugosus 
 Rubus inhorrens 
 Rubus innominatus 
 Rubus inopacatus 
 Rubus inopertus 
 Rubus insectifolius 
 Rubus insericatus 
 Rubus insignis 
 Rubus insolatus 
 Rubus insulariopsis 
 Rubus insularis 
 Rubus integribasis 
 Rubus intensior 
 Rubus intercurrens 
 Rubus intermittens 
 Rubus intricatus 
 Rubus irasuensis 
 Rubus irenaeus 
 Rubus iricus 
 Rubus iringanus 
 Rubus irritans 
 Rubus iscanus 
 Rubus ischyracanthus

J

 Rubus jamaicensis 
 Rubus jambosoides 
 Rubus jansenii 
 Rubus jarae-cimrmanii 
 Rubus jianensis 
 Rubus jinfoshanensis 
 Rubus josefianus 
 Rubus josholubii 
 Rubus juennensis 
 Rubus juvenis 
 Rubus juzepczukii

K

 Rubus kacheticus 
 Rubus × kajikumaichigo 
 Rubus × karakalensis 
 Rubus kasthuriae 
 Rubus kawakamii 
 Rubus keleterios 
 Rubus keniensis 
 Rubus × kenoensis 
 Rubus ketzkhovelii 
 Rubus khasianus 
 Rubus kiesewetteri 
 Rubus killipii 
 Rubus kirungensis 
 Rubus kisoensis 
 Rubus kletensis 
 Rubus klimmekianus 
 Rubus × knappianus 
 Rubus koehleri 
 Rubus kolmariensis 
 Rubus kudagorensis 
 Rubus kuleszae 
 Rubus kumaonensis 
 Rubus × kupcokianus 
 Rubus kwangsiensis

L

 Rubus laconensis 
 Rubus lacustris 
 Rubus laegaardii 
 Rubus laetus 
 Rubus laevicaulis 
 Rubus lagerbergii 
 Rubus lahidjanensis 
 Rubus lainzii 
 Rubus lambertianus 
 Rubus lamburnensis 
 Rubus lamprocaulos 
 Rubus lanaticaulis 
 Rubus landoltii 
 Rubus langei 
 Rubus lanuginosus 
 Rubus lanyuensis 
 Rubus largificus 
 Rubus lasiandrus 
 Rubus lasioclados 
 Rubus lasiococcus 
 Rubus lasiodermis 
 Rubus lasiostylus 
 Rubus lasiotrichos 
 Rubus lasquiensis 
 Rubus latiarcuatus 
 Rubus latifolius 
 Rubus latior 
 Rubus latisedes 
 Rubus latoauriculatus 
 Rubus laxiflorus 
 Rubus lechleri 
 Rubus leightonii 
 Rubus leiningeri 
 Rubus lentiginosus 
 Rubus lepidulus 
 Rubus leptophyllus 
 Rubus leptostemon 
 Rubus leptothyrsos 
 Rubus lesdainii 
 Rubus lettii 
 Rubus leucacanthus 
 Rubus leucandriformis 
 Rubus leucandrus 
 Rubus leucanthus 
 Rubus leuciscanus 
 Rubus leucocarpus 
 Rubus leucodermis 
 Rubus leucophaeus 
 Rubus leucostachys 
 Rubus leyanus 
 Rubus libertianus 
 Rubus lichuanensis 
 Rubus lictorum 
 Rubus lidforssii 
 Rubus liebmannii 
 Rubus lignicensis 
 Rubus lilacinus 
 Rubus limbarae 
 Rubus limitaneus 
 Rubus limitis 
 Rubus lindebergii 
 Rubus lindleyanus 
 Rubus linearifoliolus 
 Rubus lineatus 
 Rubus lingtianus 
 Rubus lishuiensis 
 Rubus liubensis 
 Rubus liui 
 Rubus lividus 
 Rubus lobatidens 
 Rubus lobophyllus 
 Rubus loehrii 
 Rubus lohfauensis 
 Rubus londinensis 
 Rubus longepedicellatus 
 Rubus longithyrsiger 
 Rubus longus 
 Rubus loosii 
 Rubus lorentzianus 
 Rubus louettensis 
 Rubus lowii 
 Rubus loxensis 
 Rubus lucens 
 Rubus lucensis 
 Rubus lucentifolius 
 Rubus luchunensis 
 Rubus ludensis 
 Rubus ludwigii 
 Rubus luminosus 
 Rubus lumnitzeri 
 Rubus lusaticus 
 Rubus luticola 
 Rubus luzoniensis

M

 Rubus maassii 
 Rubus macer 
 Rubus macgregorii 
 Rubus macilentus 
 Rubus macraei 
 Rubus macranthelos 
 Rubus macrodontus 
 Rubus macrogongylus 
 Rubus macropetalus 
 Rubus macrophyllus 
 Rubus macrostachys 
 Rubus macrostemonides 
 Rubus macrothyrsus 
 Rubus macvaughianus 
 Rubus maershanensis 
 Rubus magnisepalus 
 Rubus majusculus 
 Rubus malagassus 
 Rubus malifolius 
 Rubus malipoensis 
 Rubus malvaceus 
 Rubus malvernicus 
 Rubus mandonii 
 Rubus marianus 
 Rubus marschallianus 
 Rubus marshallii 
 Rubus marssonianus 
 Rubus martensenii 
 Rubus × masakii 
 Rubus maureri 
 Rubus maximiformis 
 Rubus × maximowiczii 
 Rubus maximus 
 Rubus mearnsii 
 Rubus megacarpus 
 Rubus megalococcus 
 Rubus megistothyrsos 
 Rubus meierottii 
 Rubus melanocladus 
 Rubus melanodermis 
 Rubus melanoxylon 
 Rubus menglaensis 
 Rubus mercicus 
 Rubus mercieri 
 Rubus merlinii 
 Rubus mesogaeus 
 Rubus metallorum 
 Rubus metoensis 
 Rubus micans 
 Rubus × michinokuensis 
 Rubus microdontus 
 Rubus micropetalus 
 Rubus microphyllus 
 Rubus milesianus 
 Rubus milfordensis 
 Rubus minusculus 
 Rubus × miscix 
 Rubus miser 
 Rubus miszczenkoi 
 Rubus mollifrons 
 Rubus mollis 
 Rubus mollissimus 
 Rubus moluccanus 
 Rubus monensis 
 Rubus montanus 
 Rubus montis-wilhelmii 
 Rubus moorei 
 Rubus morganwgensis 
 Rubus morifolius 
 Rubus mortensenii 
 Rubus moschus 
 Rubus mougeotii 
 Rubus moylei 
 Rubus mucronatiformis 
 Rubus mucronatoides 
 Rubus mucronulatus 
 Rubus muenteri 
 Rubus muhelicus 
 Rubus multifidus 
 Rubus multisetosus 
 Rubus mundii 
 Rubus muricola 
 Rubus muridens 
 Rubus murrayi 
 Rubus mus 
 Rubus myricae

N

 Rubus nagasawanus 
 Rubus × nakaii 
 Rubus nakeralicus 
 Rubus naldrettii 
 Rubus naumannii 
 Rubus neanias 
 Rubus nebulosus 
 Rubus neerlandicus 
 Rubus negatus 
 Rubus × neglectus 
 Rubus nelliae 
 Rubus nelsonii 
 Rubus nemoralis 
 Rubus nemorensis 
 Rubus nemoripetens 
 Rubus nemorosoides 
 Rubus nemorosus 
 Rubus neoebudicus 
 Rubus neofuscifolius 
 Rubus × neogardicus 
 Rubus neomalacus 
 Rubus nepalensis 
 Rubus nesiotes 
 Rubus neumannianus 
 Rubus newbouldianus 
 Rubus newbouldii 
 Rubus newbridgensis 
 Rubus newbridgensis 
 Rubus newtonii 
 Rubus nguyenii 
 Rubus × nigakuma 
 Rubus nigricans 
 Rubus nigricatus 
 Rubus nigricaulis 
 Rubus × nikaii 
 Rubus nishimuranus 
 Rubus nitidiformis 
 Rubus nivalis 
 Rubus niveus 
 Rubus nobilissimus 
 Rubus nordicus 
 Rubus norvegicus 
 Rubus norvicensis 
 Rubus × novanglicus 
 Rubus novoguineensis 
 Rubus nubigenus 
 Rubus nuptialis 
 Rubus nutkanus 
 Rubus nyalamensis

O

 Rubus oberdorferi 
 Rubus oblongifolius 
 Rubus oblongo-obovatus 
 Rubus oblongus 
 Rubus oboranus 
 Rubus obscuriflorus 
 Rubus obtusangulus 
 Rubus obvallatus 
 Rubus occidentalis 
 Rubus occultiglans 
 Rubus ochraceus 
 Rubus ochtodes 
 Rubus ocnensis 
 Rubus odoratus 
 Rubus oenensis 
 Rubus × ohmineanus 
 Rubus × ohtakiensis 
 Rubus × okae 
 Rubus okinawensis 
 Rubus oklejewiczii 
 Rubus omalodontus 
 Rubus onsalaensis 
 Rubus opacus 
 Rubus opulifolius 
 Rubus orbifrons 
 Rubus orbus 
 Rubus ordovicum 
 Rubus oreades 
 Rubus originalis 
 Rubus orthocladoides 
 Rubus orthostachyoides 
 Rubus orthostachys 
 Rubus ossicus 
 Rubus × ostensus 
 Rubus ostrinus 
 Rubus ostroviensis 
 Rubus ostumensis 
 Rubus ourosepalus 
 Rubus ovatisepalus 
 Rubus ovatus 
 Rubus oxyanchus

P

 Rubus pacificus 
 Rubus painteri 
 Rubus palaefolius 
 Rubus pallidifolius 
 Rubus pallidisetus 
 Rubus pallidus 
 Rubus palmatifolius 
 Rubus palmatus 
 Rubus palmensis 
 Rubus palmeri 
 Rubus paludosus 
 Rubus pampinosus 
 Rubus panduratus 
 Rubus paniculatus 
 Rubus pannosus 
 Rubus papuanus 
 Rubus × paracaulis 
 Rubus paraguariensis 
 Rubus parahebecarpus 
 Rubus pararosifolius 
 Rubus parkeri 
 Rubus parthenocissus 
 Rubus parviaraliifolius 
 Rubus parvifolius 
 Rubus parvus 
 Rubus pascuorum 
 Rubus pascuus 
 Rubus passaviensis 
 Rubus passionis 
 Rubus patuliformis 
 Rubus patulus 
 Rubus pauanus 
 Rubus paucidentatus 
 Rubus × paxii 
 Rubus pectinarioides 
 Rubus pectinaris 
 Rubus pectinellus 
 Rubus pedatifolius 
 Rubus pedatus 
 Rubus pedersenii 
 Rubus pedica 
 Rubus pedunculosus 
 Rubus peltatus 
 Rubus penduliflorus 
 Rubus peninsulae 
 Rubus pensilvanicus 
 Rubus pentagonus 
 Rubus peratticus 
 Rubus percrispus 
 Rubus perdemissus 
 Rubus perdigitatus 
 Rubus perfulvus 
 Rubus pericrispatus 
 Rubus perlongus 
 Rubus × permixtus 
 Rubus perpedatus 
 Rubus perperus 
 Rubus perplexus 
 Rubus perpungens 
 Rubus perrobustus 
 Rubus persicus 
 Rubus peruncinatus 
 Rubus peruvianus 
 Rubus pervalidus 
 Rubus pervirescens 
 Rubus pfuhlianus 
 Rubus phaeocarpus 
 Rubus phengodes 
 Rubus phoenicacanthus 
 Rubus phoenicolasius 
 Rubus phylloglotta 
 Rubus phyllophorus 
 Rubus phyllostachys 
 Rubus phyllothyrsos 
 Rubus picearum 
 Rubus piceetorum 
 Rubus picticaulis 
 Rubus pictorum 
 Rubus pignattii 
 Rubus pileatus 
 Rubus pilulifer 
 Rubus pinnatisepalus 
 Rubus pinnatus 
 Rubus piptopetalus 
 Rubus pirifolius 
 Rubus placidus 
 Rubus planus 
 Rubus platyacanthus 
 Rubus platybelus 
 Rubus platycephalus 
 Rubus platyphylloides 
 Rubus platyphyllus 
 Rubus platysepalus 
 Rubus playfairianus 
 Rubus plymensis 
 Rubus poliodes 
 Rubus poliophyllus 
 Rubus poliothyrsus 
 Rubus polonicus 
 Rubus polyadenus 
 Rubus polyanthemus 
 Rubus polybracteatus 
 Rubus polyodontus 
 Rubus polyoplus 
 Rubus porotoensis 
 Rubus porphyrocaulis 
 Rubus porphyromallos 
 Rubus portae-moravicae 
 Rubus posnaniensis 
 Rubus potentilloides 
 Rubus pottianus 
 Rubus praeceptorum 
 Rubus praecocifrons 
 Rubus praecox 
 Rubus praedatus 
 Rubus praestans 
 Rubus praetextus 
 Rubus praticolor 
 Rubus prei 
 Rubus preptanthus 
 Rubus pringlei 
 Rubus prionatus 
 Rubus prissanicus 
 Rubus probabilis 
 Rubus probus 
 Rubus procerus 
 Rubus projectus 
 Rubus prolongatus 
 Rubus promachonicus 
 Rubus × propinquus 
 Rubus prosper 
 Rubus pruinifer 
 Rubus pruinosus 
 Rubus pseudargenteus 
 Rubus pseudincisior 
 Rubus pseudoacer 
 Rubus × pseudochingii 
 Rubus pseudofagifolius 
 Rubus pseudoglotta 
 Rubus pseudogravetii 
 Rubus × pseudohakonensis 
 Rubus pseudohostilis 
 Rubus pseudojaponicus 
 Rubus pseudolusaticus 
 Rubus pseudopileatus 
 Rubus pseudopsis 
 Rubus pseudoswinhoei 
 Rubus pseudotenellus 
 Rubus pseudothyrsanthus 
 Rubus × pseudoyoshinoi 
 Rubus psilander 
 Rubus psilops 
 Rubus ptilocarpus 
 Rubus puberulus 
 Rubus pubescens 
 Rubus pugiunculosus 
 Rubus pulcher 
 Rubus pulchricaulis 
 Rubus pullifolius 
 Rubus pumilus 
 Rubus pungens 
 Rubus purbeckensis 
 Rubus purchasianus 
 Rubus pydarensiformis 
 Rubus pydarensis 
 Rubus pyramidatus

Q

 Rubus queenslandicus 
 Rubus questieri 
 Rubus quinquefoliolatus

R

 Rubus racemosus 
 Rubus radicans 
 Rubus radula 
 Rubus radulicaulis 
 Rubus raduliformis 
 Rubus raduloides 
 Rubus ramachandrae 
 Rubus ramosus 
 Rubus ranftii 
 Rubus raopingensis 
 Rubus raunkiaeri 
 Rubus × recurvicaulis 
 Rubus reflexus 
 Rubus refractus 
 Rubus remotifolius 
 Rubus rhombicus 
 Rubus rhombifolius 
 Rubus rhytidophyllus 
 Rubus × ribifolius 
 Rubus ribisoideus 
 Rubus riddelsdellii 
 Rubus rigidus 
 Rubus rilstonei 
 Rubus ripuaricus 
 Rubus rivularis 
 Rubus × rixosus 
 Rubus roberti 
 Rubus robiae 
 Rubus rolfei 
 Rubus rosaceus 
 Rubus rosanthus 
 Rubus roseus 
 Rubus rosifolius 
 Rubus rossensis 
 Rubus rotundatiformis 
 Rubus rotundifoliatus 
 Rubus royenii 
 Rubus rubicundus 
 Rubus ruborensis 
 Rubus rubriflorus 
 Rubus rubrisetulosus 
 Rubus rubristylus 
 Rubus rubritinctus 
 Rubus rubrumcadaver 
 Rubus rudis 
 Rubus rufescens 
 Rubus rufus 
 Rubus rugosifolius 
 Rubus rugosus 
 Rubus rugulosus 
 Rubus runssorensis 
 Rubus rusbyi

S

 Rubus saladiensis 
 Rubus salisburgensis 
 Rubus saltuum 
 Rubus salwinensis 
 Rubus salzmannii 
 Rubus sampaioanus 
 Rubus sanctae-hildegardis 
 Rubus sapidus 
 Rubus saxatilis 
 Rubus saxicola 
 Rubus saxonicus 
 Rubus scaber 
 Rubus scabripes 
 Rubus scabrosus 
 Rubus schefferi 
 Rubus scheffleri 
 Rubus schiedeanus 
 Rubus schipperi 
 Rubus schlechtendalii 
 Rubus schlechtendaliiformis 
 Rubus schleicheri 
 Rubus schleicheriformis 
 Rubus schlickumii 
 Rubus schmidelioides 
 Rubus schnedleri 
 Rubus schorleri 
 Rubus schottii 
 Rubus schumacheri 
 Rubus scidularum 
 Rubus sciocharis 
 Rubus sciophilus 
 Rubus scissoides 
 Rubus scissus 
 Rubus scoliacanthus 
 Rubus scoticus 
 Rubus sectiramus 
 Rubus seebergensis 
 Rubus segontii 
 Rubus selleanus 
 Rubus sellowii 
 Rubus semibracteosus 
 Rubus semicarpinifolius 
 Rubus semicaucasicus 
 Rubus semiglaber 
 Rubus × seminepalensis 
 Rubus semirivularis 
 Rubus semitomentosus 
 Rubus sempernitens 
 Rubus senchalensis 
 Rubus sendtneri 
 Rubus sengorensis 
 Rubus senticosus 
 Rubus septentrionalis 
 Rubus septifolius 
 Rubus serpens 
 Rubus serrae 
 Rubus serratus 
 Rubus setchuenensis 
 Rubus setosus 
 Rubus shihae 
 Rubus sieberi 
 Rubus sieboldii 
 Rubus siekensis 
 Rubus siemianicensis 
 Rubus sierrae 
 Rubus sikkimensis 
 Rubus silesiacus 
 Rubus silurum 
 Rubus silvae-bavaricae 
 Rubus silvae-bohemicae 
 Rubus silvae-norticae 
 Rubus silvae-thuringiae 
 Rubus silvaticus 
 Rubus simplex 
 Rubus sivasicus 
 Rubus slavonicus 
 Rubus slesvicensis 
 Rubus smithii 
 Rubus sneydii 
 Rubus soendrumensis 
 Rubus solvensis 
 Rubus sorbicus 
 Rubus sorsogonensis 
 Rubus spananthus 
 Rubus sparsiflorus 
 Rubus spectabilis 
 Rubus speculans 
 Rubus speculatus 
 Rubus spiculus 
 Rubus spina-curva 
 Rubus spinulatus 
 Rubus spinulosoides 
 Rubus splendidissimus 
 Rubus splendidus 
 Rubus sprengelii 
 Rubus sprengeliusculus 
 Rubus spribillei 
 Rubus squarrosus 
 Rubus stanneus 
 Rubus stans 
 Rubus steneoacanthus 
 Rubus stenopetalus 
 Rubus stereacanthos 
 Rubus steudneri 
 Rubus stimulans 
 Rubus stimuleus 
 Rubus stimulifer 
 Rubus stipulosus 
 Rubus stohrii 
 Rubus stormanicus 
 Rubus striaticaulis 
 Rubus styriacus 
 Rubus subaculeatus 
 Rubus subadenanthus 
 Rubus subcarpinifolius 
 Rubus subcoreanus 
 Rubus subinermoides 
 Rubus subinopertus 
 Rubus subintegribasis 
 Rubus subopacus 
 Rubus subornatus 
 Rubus subspicatus 
 Rubus subtercanens 
 Rubus subtibetanus 
 Rubus subtiliaceus 
 Rubus suecicus 
 Rubus suevicola 
 Rubus sulcatus 
 Rubus sumatranus 
 Rubus sundaicus 
 Rubus surrectus 
 Rubus surrejanus 
 Rubus × suspiciosus 
 Rubus swinhoei 
 Rubus sylvulicola

T

 Rubus tabanimontanus 
 Rubus taitoensis 
 Rubus taiwanicola 
 Rubus takhtadjanii 
 Rubus tamarensis 
 Rubus tamdaoensis 
 Rubus tardus 
 Rubus tarnensis 
 Rubus taronensis 
 Rubus tauni 
 Rubus × tawadanus 
 Rubus taxandriae 
 Rubus tenuiarmatus 
 Rubus tenuimollis 
 Rubus tephrodes 
 Rubus tereticaulis 
 Rubus teretiusculus 
 Rubus tetsunii 
 Rubus thalassarctos 
 Rubus thelybatos 
 Rubus thibetanus 
 Rubus thomsonii 
 Rubus × thuillieri 
 Rubus thuringensis 
 Rubus thurstonii 
 Rubus thyrsigeriformis 
 Rubus tiliaceus 
 Rubus tiliaster 
 Rubus tiliifrons 
 Rubus tinifolius 
 Rubus titanus 
 Rubus tonkinensis 
 Rubus × toyorensis 
 Rubus tozawae 
 Rubus transvaliensis 
 Rubus transvestitus 
 Rubus × tranzschelii 
 Rubus trelleckensis 
 Rubus treutleri 
 Rubus trichanthus 
 Rubus tricolor 
 Rubus trifidus 
 Rubus trifoliolatus 
 Rubus × trifrons 
 Rubus trigonus 
 Rubus trijugus 
 Rubus trilobus 
 Rubus trinovantium 
 Rubus trivialis 
 Rubus troiensis 
 Rubus × trux 
 Rubus tubanticus 
 Rubus tumidus 
 Rubus tumulorum 
 Rubus turkestanicus 
 Rubus turquinensis

U

 Rubus ubericus 
 Rubus uhdeanus 
 Rubus ulmifolius 
 Rubus umbrosus 
 Rubus uncinatus 
 Rubus undabundus 
 Rubus urbionicus 
 Rubus ursinus 
 Rubus urticifolius 
 Rubus utchinensis

V

 Rubus vadalis 
 Rubus vagabundus 
 Rubus vagensis 
 Rubus vallis-cembrae 
 Rubus vandebeekii 
 Rubus vandermeijdenii 
 Rubus vaniloquus 
 Rubus vanwinkelii 
 Rubus varvicensis 
 Rubus vastus 
 Rubus vatavensis 
 Rubus velox 
 Rubus velutinus 
 Rubus venetorum 
 Rubus venosus 
 Rubus venustus 
 Rubus verae-crucis 
 Rubus vernus 
 Rubus vespicum 
 Rubus vestitus 
 Rubus vigoi 
 Rubus vigursii 
 Rubus vikensis 
 Rubus villarsianus 
 Rubus villicauliformis 
 Rubus villosior 
 Rubus vindomensis 
 Rubus viridescens 
 Rubus viridilucidus 
 Rubus viscosus 
 Rubus volkensii 
 Rubus vratnensis 
 Rubus vulcanicola

W

 Rubus waddellii 
 Rubus wahlbergii 
 Rubus wallichianus 
 Rubus walsemannii 
 Rubus walteri 
 Rubus wangii 
 Rubus wardii 
 Rubus warrenii 
 Rubus watsonii 
 Rubus wawushanensis 
 Rubus weberbaueri 
 Rubus wedgwoodiae 
 Rubus weizensis 
 Rubus wendtii 
 Rubus wessbergii 
 Rubus wilsonii 
 Rubus wimmerianus 
 Rubus winteri 
 Rubus wirralensis 
 Rubus wirtgenii 
 Rubus × wisconsinensis 
 Rubus wittigianus 
 Rubus woronowii 
 Rubus wushanensis 
 Rubus wuzhianus

X

 Rubus xanthocarpus 
 Rubus xanthoneurus 
 Rubus xichouensis 
 Rubus xiphophorus

Y

 Rubus yanyunii 
 Rubus × yatabei 
 Rubus × yenosimanus 
 Rubus yingjiangensis 
 Rubus yiwuanus 
 Rubus yoshinoi 
 Rubus yuliensis 
 Rubus yunanicus

Z

 Rubus zangezurus 
 Rubus zhaogoshanensis 
 Rubus zielinskii 
 Rubus zixishanensis

See also
Rubus dorcheae
 Rubus violaceifrons

References

Rubus